The CMLL Universal Championship 2014 (Campeonato Universal in Spanish) was a professional wrestling tournament produced by the Consejo Mundial de Lucha Libre (CMLL) promotion, which took place over three Super Viernes shows between August 15 and 29, 2014, in Arena México, Mexico City, Mexico. The CMLL Universal Championship is an annual tournament of CMLL champions that was first held in 2009 and has been held annually ever since. Being a professional wrestling tournament, it is not won legitimately; it is instead won via predetermined outcomes to the matches that is kept secret from the general public.

Background
The tournament featured 15 professional wrestling matches under single-elimination tournament rules, which means that wrestlers were eliminated when they lose a match. There were no specific storylines that build to the tournament, which has been held annually since 2009. All male "non-regional" CMLL champions at the time of the tournament were involved in the tournament, The CMLL World Mini-Estrella Championship and Mexican National Lightweight Championship are both exclusively for CMLL's Mini-Estrella division and thus not eligible for the tournament. Regionally promoted championships such as the CMLL Arena Coliseo Tag Team Championship and the Occidente championships promoted in Guadalajara, Jalisco were not included in the tournament; only titles that have been defended in CMLL's main venue Arena Mexico were included. The tournament was divided into two qualifying blocks, which took place on August 15 and August 22, while the final took place on August 29, 2014.

2014 Universal Championship tournament
When CMLL announced the 2014 tournament the following champions were eligible to participate:

Reigning CMLL World Welterweight Champion Místico did not take part in the tournament due to an injury.

Block A

Block A took place on August 15, 2014, and featured eight champions wrestling for a place in the finals.

Block B

Block B took place on August 22, 2014, and featured eight champions wrestling for a place in the finals.

Finals
The finals of the tournament took place on August 29, 2014, and saw the 2009 Universal Champion Último Guerrero defeat the 2011 Universal Champion La Sombra to become the first two-time Universal Champion.

References

2014 in professional wrestling
CMLL Universal Championship
2014 in Mexico
August 2014 events in Mexico